TCM may refer to:

Arts and music

Film
 The Texas Chainsaw Massacre (franchise), a horror film franchise
 The Texas Chain Saw Massacre, the original 1974 film
 The Texas Chainsaw Massacre (2003 film), the 2003 remake

Games
 The Corporate Machine, a 2001 personal computer game from Stardock
 Total Club Manager, football (soccer) management series of video games from Bright Future (in older releases EA sports)

Music
 The Color Morale, a post-hardcore band from Rockford, Illinois
 The Crystal Method, an electronic music group
 Tianjin Conservatory of Music
 Tokyo College of Music
 Trinity College of Music, a leading music conservatory, based in Greenwich, London, United Kingdom

Automotive
 Transmission control module, an electronic device to manage an automobile's transmission

Companies
 Teledyne Continental Motors, an American engine manufacturing company
 Times Community Media, an American newspaper company
 Toshiba Consumer Marketing Corporation, a division of Toshiba
 TCM (Macau), a bus company in Macau
 Turner Classic Movies, a U.S. cable TV and satellite network:
 Turner Classic Movies (UK and Ireland)
 Turner Classic Movies Germany, renamed TNT Film in 2009, now WarnerTV Film
 Turner Classic Movies (Nordic)
 Turner Classic Movies (Middle East and Africa)
 Turner Classic Movies (Asia)

Computing and telecommunications
 Thermal Conduction Module, by IBM
 Tightly-coupled memory, memory which resides directly on the processor of a computer - see multiprocessing
 Time Compression Multiplex, a time-division duplex scheme
 Toolkit for Conceptual Modeling, a collection of software tools to present specifications of software systems
 Trellis coded modulation, a signal modulation scheme for telecommunications

Places
 McChord Field, Washington state, United States (IATA airport code: TCM)
 The Computer Museum, Boston
 The Contemporary Museum, Honolulu, Hawaii, an art museum now called the Honolulu Museum of Art Spalding House
 The Children's Museum of Indianapolis, shortened TCM in its inventory numbers (for example, the museum's most famous Triceratops specimen has been named TCM 2001.93.1)

Science and medicine
 TCM, central memory T cell, in medicine
 Theory of Condensed Matter group, a theoretical physics research group in the Cavendish Laboratory at the University of Cambridge
 Tetrachloromethane, an organic compound also known as carbon tetrachloride
 Traditional Chinese medicine, a range of traditional medicine practices used in China.
 Trajectory correction maneuver, in space travel; see, for example, Voyager 1
 Trichloromethane or chloroform, a solvent, and former anaesthetic

Models and processes
 Three-component model of organizational commitment in organizational behavior and industrial and organizational psychology
 Total cost management, a process using principles of cost engineering for portfolio, program, and project management

Sports
 Toronto Canada Moose, a tier II junior A ice hockey team based out of Thornhill, Ontario, Canada
 Twin Cities Marathon, an annual marathon in Minneapolis-Saint Paul

Other
 tcm, ISO 639-3 code for the Sumeri language of West Papua, New Guinea
 The Creativity Movement, an arm of Creativity (religion), a white supremacist organisation
 TRADOC Capability Manager, personnel responsible for US Army user requirements